Allpahuayo-Mishana National Reserve is a protected area in Peru located southwest of Iquitos in the region of Loreto. It was established in 2004 to protect the diverse forest types in the area, especially the rainforests on white sandy soil and watercourses which provide drinking water to the city of Iquitos.

Geography 
The area presents a varied topography going from seasonally flooded terrain to well-drained hills. Soils are also diverse, ranging from clay to almost pure quartz sand.

The Nanay river contributes to the flooding dynamic in the area, with a peak level in May, and a lowest level in September with ca. 6 meters of difference.

Climate 
Tropical, with an average temperature of 26 °C and an annual precipitation between 2500 and 3000 mm.

Ecology 
Tropical forests in the area are varied due to the diverse soils with two main types of forests: seasonally flooded forests and forests on white sand.

Flora 
Plants found in the reserve include: Hevea guianensis, Syagrus smithii, Epistephium parviflorum, Pachira insignis, Oenocarpus bataua, Cordia nodosa, Aspidosperma excelsum, Micrandra spruceana, Iriartea deltoidea, Diclinanona tessmannii, Bactris simplicifrons, Pagamea coriacea, Theobroma subincanum, Parkia multijuga, Coryanthes alborosea, Annona montana, Brosimum utile, Euterpe precatoria, Iryanthera juruensis, etc.

Fauna 
Mammals present in the area include: the red brocket, the brown-mantled tamarin, the lowland paca, the South American coati, the Northern Amazon red squirrel, the kinkajou, the brown woolly monkey, the jaguar, etc.

Birds present in the reserve include: the white-throated tinamou, the blue-and-yellow macaw, the nocturnal curassow, the reddish hermit, the Iquitos gnatcatcher, the Connecticut warbler, the Mishana tyrannulet, the fork-tailed woodnymph, the white-throated toucan, Spix's guan, the white-necked jacobin, the red-necked woodpecker, etc.

Amphibians present in the reserve include: Boana geographica, Pristimantis acuminatus, Ranitomeya reticulata, Leptodactylus pentadactylus, etc.

References

External links 
Allpahuayo-Mishana National Reserve. Profile at Protectedplanet.net

National Reservations of Peru
Geography of Loreto Region
Protected areas established in 2004